Hascombe is a village in Surrey, England. It contains a large cluster of cottages and country estates, St Peter's church, the village green, a fountain, pond, a central public house and is surrounded by steep wooded hillsides.

History
Above the village is Hascombe Hill which is the site of a ruined hillfort built by the ancient Britons and occupied by them during the 1st century BCE. The word "combe" is derived from cwm meaning "valley" in the Welsh language and this may indicate that the population of Hascombe remained predominantly Brythonic for some time after the surrounding areas had been populated by Anglo-Saxon settlers.

The name of the village is thought to come from Hægscombe meaning valley of the witch or "hag" in Old English. The village was not mentioned by name in the Domesday Book and it is thought to have been part of the manor of Bramley.

Landmarks

The public house, The White Horse, a 16th- or 17th-century building with many later extensions, constructed from the local Bargate stone, a local term for the hard masonry material which is a type of limestone with traces of greensand.

A short walk along the main street into the semi-rural southern part of the main street a metre-high, 4 metre square animal pound appears to the west, a stone 15th century construction according to English Heritage, and which is listed for its uniqueness in the county.

St Peter's church
St Peter's church, which is grade II* listed, was rebuilt during the mid-19th century, and the new church consecrated in June 1864.  The original church dated from the 13th century but by 1862, when Canon Vernon Musgrave became rector, it was described as being in a poor condition. The architect of the new church was Henry Woodyer, a pupil of William Butterfield. The church is built of local Bargate stone, with a simple nave, chancel, and lady chapel. The roof rafters are cusped and gilded. The stained-glass is mostly by Hardman Powell and the decoration is by J A Pippet, a freelance artist employed by Hardman.

The medieval rood screen, made from Jerusalem olive trees and featuring elaborate carvings and paintings, remains from the old church and was restored in 1864 and decorated by Hardman and Powell. The font of Purbeck marble dates back to 1690. 

Poet Laureate Sir John Betjeman described the church as "a Tractarian work of art". The walls of the nave are decorated with the scene of the ‘miraculous draught of fishes’ with 'one hundred and fifty and three' fishes caught in a net dragged by the six disciples. Above the chancel arch is a painting of the Last Judgement, and on the inside of the arch is a picture of our Lord with angels. The walls of the choir and sanctuary have scenes from the Bible depicting the ministry of Angels. The stained glass in the chancel are scenes from the life of our Lord. The central window shows Christ on the cross. The reredos above the altar shows the Adoration of the Lamb. At the entrance to the chancel is a Victorian brass to Canon Vernon Musgrave. The pulpit panels show our Lord together with Noah, St Peter, and St John the Baptist. The west window by William Holland shows Jesus in the fishing boat calming the storm, in memory of Conyers Middleton who was rector from 1747 to his death in 1750. The Lady Chapel was created in 1935 and contains a squint window. The east window in the Lady Chapel is by Clayton and Bell and the lancet windows by Hardman Powell commemorating the Godman family.

The damming of a stream in the 15th century created the Church Pond.

Geography
Hascombe's natural fresh-water spring attracts many visitors: the fountain itself was commissioned in 1887 by local landowner Edward Lee Rowcliffe as a memorial to his late brother.

Hills
A promontory that adjoins Hascombe Hill from 1796 to 1816 Hascombe hosted a station in the shutter telegraph chain which connected the Admiralty in London to its naval ships in Portsmouth.

Hascombe has the following summits in the large Surrey Hills AONB:

Residents

Hascombe is in a ward, Bramley, Busbridge and Hascombe, which has much higher than average home ownership than the South East Region and nation. Current and former residents include the film star Dirk Bogarde; Russian businessman Boris Berezovsky; former member of The Jam, Bruce Foxton; boss of McLaren F1 Formula One racing team, Ron Dennis; broadcaster Chris Evans; and actor Billie Piper

The wildlife artist Archibald Thorburn lived and died in the village. His grave lies in the parish churchyard. It was during a stay at Hoe Farm in 1915 that statesman and future Prime Minister Sir Winston Churchill learned to paint.  The Surrey Hills AONB, one of the many natural landscapes of the county, which includes this parish contributes much to the county's mean high level of domestic incomes.

References
A History of Hascombe – A Surrey Village by Winifred Ashton

External links

 

Borough of Waverley
Villages in Surrey
Civil parishes in Surrey